is a Japanese footballer currently playing as a winger or a right back for Iwate Grulla Morioka, on loan from Yokohama F. Marinos.

Career statistics

Club
.

Notes

References

External links

2002 births
Living people
Japanese footballers
Association football midfielders
Yokohama F. Marinos players
Iwate Grulla Morioka players